Silent Valley is a 1935 American Western film directed by Bernard B. Ray and starring Tom Tyler, Al Bridge and Nancy Deshon.

Cast
 Tom Tyler as Sheriff Tom Hall  
 Al Bridge as Jim Farley 
 Nancy Deshon as Helen Jones  
 Hal Taliaferro as Fred Jones 
 Charles King as Henchman Harry Keller  
 Slim Whitaker as Pete Childers, aka Peterson 
 Art Miles as Deputy George Hull  
 Murdock MacQuarrie as Rancher Barnes

References

Bibliography
 Pitts, Michael R. Poverty Row Studios, 1929–1940: An Illustrated History of 55 Independent Film Companies, with a Filmography for Each. McFarland & Company, 2005.

External links
 

1935 films
1935 Western (genre) films
American Western (genre) films
Films directed by Bernard B. Ray
Reliable Pictures films
American black-and-white films
1930s English-language films
1930s American films